Priyayi (former spelling: Prijaji) was the Dutch-era class of the nobles of the robe, as opposed to royal nobility or ningrat (Javanese), in Java, Indonesia. Priyayi is a Javanese word originally denoting the descendants of the adipati or governors, the first of whom were appointed in the 17th century by the Sultan Agung of Mataram to administer the principalities he had conquered. Initially court officials in pre-colonial kingdoms, the priyayi moved into the colonial civil service and then on to administrators of the modern Indonesian republic.

Pre-colonial period 

The Mataram Sultanate, an Islamic polity in south central Java that reached its peak in the 17th century, developed a kraton ("court") culture from which the Sultan emerged as a charismatic figure that rules over a relatively independent aristocracy. Named para yayi ("the king’s brothers"), nobles, officials, administrators, and chiefs were integrated in a patron-client relationship with the Sultan to preside over the peripheries of the kingdom. The homeland of priyayi culture is attributed to Mataram’s center, namely the Javanese-speaking middle and eastern parts of Java. Although "Javanized" by Mataram’s political expansion, the Sundanese-speaking western part of Java, the easternmost parts of Java, and the nearby island of Madura retain ethnic, linguistic, and cultural differences from the Mataramese heartland.

Colonial period 

After the arrival of the Dutch East India Company (VOC) and the collapse of Mataram, the Sunanate of Surakarta and Sultanate Yogyakarta became centers of Javanese political power since the 1755 Treaty of Giyanti. Although Dutch political influence severely limited their autonomy throughout the colonial period, the two kingdoms continued to serve as symbols of Javanese courtly culture. In the lowland rural areas of Java, the presence of a centralized indigenous bureaucracy strengthened state control over uncultivated land, and helped transform the peasantry from independent smallholders to agricultural laborers.

Government offices 

Outside of the areas ruled directly by Yogyakarta and Surakarta, Dutch colonial authorities established two civil service bodies: the Binnenlands Bestuur ("Interior Administration"), staffed by Dutch officials, and the Pangreh Praja ("Ruler of the Realm"), the indigenous bureaucracy.

By 1926, the Binnenlands Bestuur in the directly ruled areas of Java and Madura consisted of the following offices with territorial responsibilities, in descending order:

 Governor; 3 positions
 Resident; approximately 20 positions
 Assistant Resident; approximately 70 positions

In turn, there were three pangreh praja offices with territorial responsibilities, staffed by the indigenous priyayi, in descending order:

 Bupati ("Regent"); approximately 70 positions. A bupati is responsible for a kabupaten, often a polity with a semi-autonomous history. The position of a bupati was often inherited from father to son, a practice allowed under the 1854 Dutch Constitutions, and families of the bupati often formed a local aristocratic class. The bupati is subordinate to, and usually has a one-to-one correspondence with, the assistant resident ‒ the lowest ranking official of the Binnenlands Bestuur.
 Wedana ("District Chief"); approximately 400 positions.
 Asisten Wedana ("Sub-District Chief"); approximately 1,200 positions.

Other colonial government employees considered to be of priyayi stature included tax officials, prosecutors, and officials attached to police units. By 1931, Europeans accounted only for 10 percent of the entire state apparatus in the Dutch East Indies, and over 250,000 native officials were on state payroll. In Java, a class distinction existed between priyagung ("upper priyayi"), a group well connected to the aristocratic elite in Surakarta and Yogyakarta, and priyayi cilik ("lower priyayi"). Nonetheless, the social distance separating the priyayi from the peasantry is much greater than that separating the priyagung from the priyayi cilik.

Nationalist movements 

In 1901, the Dutch East Indies government established the so-called Ethische Politiek ("Ethical Politics") as an official policy. The Ethical Politics paradigm extended the colonial state control through educational, religious, agricultural, resource extraction, and political surveillance institutions over the native population until Japanese occupation of 1942. Western-style education became available to the native populace, although only the wealthy could afford tuition at the secondary and tertiary institutions where Dutch is the primary language of instruction. Among the Javanese, priyayi men were the first to be educated at Western-style institutions before entering the colonial civil service.

Nationalistic sentiments among Javanese elites who received Dutch education were formative in the era of the Indonesian National Awakening. The Boedi Oetomo, the first indigenous political society in the Dutch East Indies, was established by a group of priyayi doctors and medical students in 1908. Although the group was confined to a Javanese, male priyayi following, the Boedi Oetomo was the first in a series of indigenous political activism in the Dutch East Indies. The Boedi Oetomo gave rise to prominent priyayi figures such as Soetatmo Soeriekosomo (1888-1924) and Noto Soeroto (1888-1951), who are advocates for ethnic nationalism through the Committee for Javanese Nationalism, as well as advocates of Indies-wide nationalism, such as Tjipto Mangoenkoesoemo (1886-1943) who later founded the Indische Party. The emergence of other ethnic nationalist groups and Indies-nationalist political parties in Java later eclipsed Javanese nationalism and gave rise to the emergence of a broader, Indonesian-language nationalism throughout the 1920s and 30s.

Post-independence period 

The recognition of the Republic of Indonesia in 1949 by Dutch authorities resulted in the integration of bureaucratic institutions from Dutch-controlled federal states into the new Republic. The number of civil servants in Indonesia thus grew from 115,000 in the late 1920s to 400,000 in the early 1950s. However, the strategic top echelons were dominated by an elite group of 100,000 Dutch-trained senior officials, which were concentrated in the Ministry of the Interior. By the 1980s, Indonesia’s civil service expanded to approximately 2 million members, which amounted to 13.9 civil servants per 1,000 of the population, in contrast to the much lower 3.7 per 1,000 in 1950.

Although the status of a priyayi does not have a formal presence in post-Independence Indonesian law, proximity to the executive branches of the state, which it symbolizes, remained a popular mode of upward socio-political mobility from the 1950s and after. The New Order government of Suharto encouraged traditional priyayi and corporatist value in the Indonesian civil service, especially through the establishment of the Indonesian Civil Servants' Corps (KORPRI) in 1971.

Titles 

The priyayi class used elaborate title system. Some of the commonly used titles among Javanese nobility were:

 Raden Mas: used by male nobility
 Raden Ayu: used by married female nobility
 Raden Ajeng: used by unmarried female nobility
 Tumenggung: additional title, used by nobility who held a Regency office
  Raden: a title used by male nobility lower than Raden Mas
 Raden Nganten: a title used by married female nobility lower than Raden Ayu
 Raden Rara (read as Raden Roro): a title used by unmarried female nobility lower than Raden Ajeng
 Mas: a title for male petty nobility

The order of precedence for male nobility title is: a simple Mas is the lowest, followed by simple Raden, and then the higher titles are compound titles of Raden Mas, Raden Panji, Raden Tumenggung, Raden Ngabehi and Raden Aria. These title were hereditary in some extents; a son will inherit a title one level lower than his parent, unless it is already of the lowest rank.

The honorific Raden is related to the Malagasy noble titles of Randriana or Andriana, both of which are derived from the word "Rahadyan" (Ra-hadi-an), meaning "Lord" or "Master" in Old Javanese.

Cultural attributes 

American cultural anthropologist Clifford Geertz explained two cultural oppositions in priyayi worldview that characterizes the priyayi as a social status: alus ("refined") against kasar ("unrefined"), and batin ("inner human experience") against lahir ("outer human behavior"). As a feudalistic subculture in Javanese society distinct from the peasantry, priyayi culture emphasizes the alus over the kasar, and the batin over the lahir.

Religion 

The principal religion of the ethnic Javanese populace in the provinces of Central Java, East Java, and the Special Region of Yogyakarta is Islam, although there are minorities of Roman Catholic Christians, Protestant Christians, Hindus, and Buddhists. Within Javanese Islam, Geertz identified three alirans, or cultural streams: the abangan, the santri, and the priyayi. Members of the santri stream are more likely to be urban dwellers, and tend to be oriented to the mosque, the Qur'an, and to Islamic canon law. In contrast, the abangan tend to be from village peasant backgrounds and absorb both Hindu and Muslim elements, forming a culture of animist and folk traditions. The priyayi stream is the traditional bureaucratic elite and was strongly driven by hierarchical Hindu-Javanese tradition. The santri are sometimes referred to as Putihan ("the white ones") as distinct from the 'red' abangan. In general, the religion of the priyayi is closer to the abangan tradition than the santri, because of its combination of Indic polytheism and Islamic monotheism. Public rituals, such as slametan, or the communal feast, are practiced in abangan peasant and priyayi households alike.

Priyayi families on the coastal center and eastern parts of the island, however emphasize genealogical ties to the wali sanga, the nine Islamic saints of Java, and are closer to the santri in their religious practices than their hinterland counterparts.

Socio-economic status 

While the abangan are often peasants, the priyayi is the class of the landed gentry of towns and urban population centers. Unlike feudal landlords, however, the priyayi of the Dutch colonial period are white-collar government employees who work as bureaucrats, teachers, and clerks. The priyayi distinguish themselves from the peasantry and the merchant class by defining their work for the government as alus ("refined"), as opposed to trading, farming, and laboring, which are defined as kasar ("unrefined"). An early 19th century poem, "Suluk Mas Nganten," written by Jayadiningrat I, a Surakarta courtier, describes priyayi as a charismatic power, and not just socio-economic stature, that merchants cannot achieve:

Ana maneh nisthane wong memantu
ana ta sudagar cilik
awatara sugihipun
kepengin cara priyayi

Again there is the shame of one who held a wedding
There was a petty merchant
Middling was his wealth
He yearned to follow the style of the priyayi

Priyayi families, however, also engage in trading through informal channels. Until the 1980s, priyayi women often supplement their household income by selling homemade textiles and craftswear, although trading in public places is seen as inappropriate for upper- and middle-class priyayi women.

Language 

Literacy and command of multiple Javanese language registers were sources of priyayi prestige during the Dutch colonial era, when the majority of Java’s population were illiterate. The two major levels of discourse in the Javanese language are krama ("formal") and ngoko ("informal"). Mastery of krama, a set of registers primarily spoken up the social hierarchy, requires high levels of education. Towards the end of the 19th century, when younger cadres of priyayi received Dutch-language education, the Javanese "inner elite" began adopting Dutch not only as a language used at work when interacting with the Dutch, but also at home and among Javanese circles. The colonial era priyayi, therefore, became a largely bilingual class. Since independence, Indonesian has been adopted as a national language, and new styles of Indonesian and Javanese have emerged as a continuation of the krama and ngoko registers in official publications and popular literature.

Arts 

The priyayi are patrons and practitioners of classical, courtly Javanese art forms, which they regard as alus and refined in contrast to the peasant art forms:

wayang; the shadow-play that performs Javanese retellings of the Ramayana, the Mahabharata, and the history of pre-colonial Javanese kingdoms
gamelan; the percussion orchestra that accompanies wayang performances or performs independently
lakon; dramatizations of wayang stories and myths that are retold orally
tembang; rigid forms of poetry that is recited or sung with gamelan accompaniment
batik; textile-making with wax and dye

See also
 Hinduism in Java
 Indonesian Esoteric Buddhism
 Javanese Kshatriya
 Javanisation
 Kejawen
 Slametan
 Djajadiningrat family
 Han family of Lasem

Notes

References

Schiel (1975), p. 79

Further reading 
 Bertrand, Romain, Etat colonial, noblesse et nationalisme à Java. La Tradition parfaite, Karthala, Paris, 2005, 

 
Social history of Indonesia
Javanese culture
Islam in Indonesia